Ilmari Haimi (6 March 1908 – 13 July 1979) was a Finnish equestrian. He competed in two events at the 1952 Summer Olympics.

References

External links
 

1908 births
1979 deaths
Finnish male equestrians
Olympic equestrians of Finland
Equestrians at the 1952 Summer Olympics
People from Lappeenranta
Sportspeople from South Karelia